The Karnataka Vikas Grameena Bank (KVGB), an Indian  Regional Rural Bank sponsored by Canara Bank.
It is under the ownership of Ministry of Finance , Government of India. The bank provides retail banking services to rural users and has 628 branches in areas of Karnataka, around North and Western Karnataka.

History
The bank was constituted on 12 September 2005 after amalgamation of four Regional Rural Banks (RRBs) namely Malaprabha Grameena Bank, Bijapur(Vijayapura) Grameena Bank, Varada Grameena Bank and Netravathi Grameena Banks as per recommendations of the Narasimhan Committee under Government of India Notification dated 12 September 2005. All four amalgamated RRBs were sponsored by Syndicate Bank(Now Canara Bank) and were located in Karnataka.

After amalgamation in 2005, the level of the bank’s business was around 23263.73 Crore. After the merger, the RRB was named Karnataka Vikas Grameena Bank with its head office at Dharwad under the sponsorship of Syndicate Bank. Puttaganti Gopi Krishna, General Manager of Canara Bank, took charge as the new Chairman of Karnataka Vikas Grameena Bank (KVGB), a Dharwad-headquartered Regional Rural Bank, on July 22, 2019.

Karnataka Vikas Grameena Bank was established on 12th Sept 2005, by a Govt. of India Notification, Amalgamating four Regional Rural Banks sponsored by Syndicate Bank in the state of Karnataka. The amalgamated erstwhile Grameena Banks are Bijapur Grameena Bank, Malaprabha Grameena Bank, Netravati Grameena Bank and Varada Grameena Bank. For operational convenience, bank has set up TEN Regional Offices at Bagalkot, Belgaum, Bijapur (Vijayapur), Chikkodi, Dharwad, Gadag, Gokak Haveri, Kumta (Uttar Kannada) & Mangaluru (Dakshin Kannada). Bank is operating in almost 1/3rd of the geographical area of Karnataka state consisting of 6 districts of northern Karnataka and 3 districts of coastal Karnataka. The 6 northern districts are Bagalkot, Belagavi, Bijapur (Vijayapur), Dharwad, Gadag and 3 coastal districts are Mangaluru, Udupi and Uttar Kannada.

The total business of the Bank stands at Rs. 26269 Crore as on 31.03.2020 , consisting of Rs. 15178 Crores deposits and Advances of Rs. 11090 Crores and has Reserves of Rs. 1139 Crores. This is the age of Information Technology and banks are no exception as the entire banking sphere is also driven by technology. Our bank is also providing Core Banking Solutions at par with Nationalized/Private Banks. Transforming India into a Cashless / less Cash Economy is one of the integral strategies of the Government of India. In order to supplement the digitalization and Cashless/ less Cash transactions, the Bank has developed its own mobile application which is very user friendly and users have rated the app at 4.3 on a scale of 5.0.

Area of operations
Head Office of the Bank is situated at Dharwad, located in the state of Karnataka. The bank is currently operating in 9 districts in the State which are:-
 Bagalkote
 Belagavi
 Vijayapura (Bijapura)
 Dakshina Kannada
 Dharwad
 Gadag
 Haveri
 Udupi
 Uttara kannada

Products and services

SAVING ACCOUNTS
 SAVINGS ACCOUNT

DEPOSIT SCHEMES
 VIKAS SANCHAYANI PLUS
 VIKAS SANTUSTI DEPOSIT SCHEME WITH OVERDRAFT FACILITY
 VIKAS BONANZA 456
 AKSHAYA CASH CERTIFICATE
 NIRANTARA DAILY DEPOSIT SCHEME
 VIKAS TAX ULITAYA - Tax Saving Fixed Deposit

LOAN PRODUCTS
 VIKAS GRIHA - Vehicle Loan To General Public
 VIKAS ADHAR - Mortgage Loan
 VIKAS KISAN CREDIT CARD
 AGRI TOURISM
 VIKAS SAATHI - Mobile Van For Dealers & Traders
 MODEL DAIRY UNIT
 VIKAS GRIHALANKAR - Interior Decoration of Residential House
 FINANCING TO LANDSCAPE WORK
 VIKAS GRIHA FLEXI - Housing Loan Overdraft Facility
 DRIP IRRIGATION FACILITY
 VIKAS VAHAN - Vehicle Loans For All
 VIKAS SARALA SANJEEVINI - OD Facility To Doctors
 VIKAS MITRA SCHEME - Vehicle Loan To Milk Vendors & Others
 VIKAS ANNAPOORNA - For Hotel & Restaurants
 VIKAS NIRANTARA – DL on Pigmy
 VIKAS SUVARNA – Jewel Loan Scheme
 VIKAS KIRAN – Solar Home Lighting & Water Heating Systems loans

See also

 Banking in India
 List of banks in India
 Reserve Bank of India
 Regional Rural Bank
 Indian Financial System Code
 List of largest banks
 List of companies of India
 Make in India

References

Regional rural banks of India
Banks based in Karnataka
2005 establishments in Karnataka
Banks established in 2005
Indian companies established in 2005